Jarret Myer (born February 6, 1973) is an American media entrepreneur who co-founded the record label Rawkus Records, the YouTube talent company Big Frame, and the digital media brand Uproxx. Since the sale of Uproxx to Woven Digital in 2014, Myer has served as Woven Digital's general manager of publishing.

Rawkus Records 
Myer founded independent hip hop label Rawkus Records with partners Brian Brater and James Murdoch in 1996. Myer met his cofounders while attending Horace Mann School. The label's high-volume model of 12-inch releases was based on the strategy of punk rock music labels like SST and Victory. The label became known for producing up-and-coming hip hop artists. Myer and Brater scouted and signed all of the label's acts themselves, including Mos Def and Talib Kweli. The label received financial support first from News Corp and then MCA from 2002 until MCA was absorbed by Interscope Geffen A&M Records in 2004.

Myer was named on New York magazine's "35 Under 35" list in 2000 for his work with Rawkus Records.

Uproxx 
Myer co-founded Uproxx Media in 2008 and served as its CEO until its sale to Woven Digital in 2014.

Big Frame 
Myer founded Big Frame with partners Steve Raymond, Brian Brater and Sarah Evershed in 2011.

References

External links 
Uproxx
Woven Digital website

1973 births
American music industry executives
Place of birth missing (living people)
Brown University alumni
Living people
Horace Mann School alumni
21st-century American businesspeople